The Shire of Gnowangerup is a local government area in the Great Southern region of Western Australia, about  north of Albany and about  southeast of the capital, Perth.

History
Gnowangerup was initially gazetted as the Gnowangerup Road District on 26 January 1912, taking in territory that had been part of the Broomehill and Tambellup road districts. On 23 June 1961, it became a shire following the passage of the Local Government Act 1960, which reformed all remaining road districts into shires. On 4 June 1982, the eastern half of the Gnowangerup shire was excised to form the Shire of Jerramungup.

Wards
In 1999 the Shire was divided into four wards:
 Borden Ward (two councillors)
 Gnowangerup Ward (three councillors)
 Ongerup Ward (two councillors)
 Rural Ward (two councillors)
Since 2007, when the ward system was discontinued, all councillors have been elected at large from the Gnowangerup district.

The Shire President is chosen from amongst the councillors.

Towns and localities
The towns and localities of the Shire of Gnowangerup with population and size figures based on the most recent Australian census:

( * indicates locality is only partially located within this shire)

Heritage-listed places

As of 2023, 115 places are heritage-listed in the Shire of Gnowangerup, of which two are on the State Register of Heritage Places, the Telyarup Homestead and the Gnowangerup Noongar Centre, both located in the town of Gnowangerup.

References

External links
 

Gnowangerup